Cyrus Prindle (April 11, 1800 – December 1, 1885) was an American abolitionist and one of the founders of the Wesleyan Church.  He was born in Canaan, Conn., and entered the New York conference in 1821.  An Abolitionist in principle, he was removed from important appointments to the poorest, and in 1843 with others he seceded from the Methodist Episcopal church and founded the Wesleyan church.  When the movement had accomplished its purpose, with about 100 others of his ministerial associates, he returned to the Methodist church.  He died in Cleveland, Ohio.

References

External links
 

History of Methodism in the United States
American abolitionists
American Christian clergy
People from Canaan, Connecticut
1800 births
1885 deaths
American Methodists
19th-century Methodist ministers
Methodist abolitionists
19th-century American clergy